Edmund Hein (13 August 1940 – 19 August 2022) was a German economist and politician. A member of the Christian Democratic Union of Germany, he served in the Landtag of Saarland from 1970 to 1994.

Hein died on 19 August 2022, at the age of 82.

References

1940 births
2022 deaths
German economists
Christian Democratic Union of Germany politicians
Members of the Landtag of Saarland
Saarland University alumni
People from Saarlouis (district)